Tahir Aslam gora   (born September 26, 1963) is a Canadian broadcaster, editor, publisher, (English to Urdu) translator, and writer of fiction and non-fiction. He is a campaigner against the dangers of the Political Islam and the Muslim Brotherhood. He co-authored "The Danger of Political Islam to Canada: (With a Warning to America)" exposing how the ideology of political Islam threatens countries and governments around the world, especially Canada and how the current policy of Canadian Prime Minister Justin Trudeau will jeopardize his country as a result of adapting and welcoming all Islamist and religious political currents. He was forced to flee Pakistan in 1999 following threats to his life and found asylum in Canada. As a member of Muslim Reform Movement and Founder & CEO of TAG TV, he holds progressive ideology and supports freedom of expression.

Early and personal life
He was born in September 1963 in Lahore, Pakistan. He is married to Haleema Sadia and the two have launched TAG TV, a United States and Canada based news channel.

Politics
Tahir Gora ran for Federal elections in the Mississauga-Malton riding and received 0.7% of the vote.

Accolades and legacy
He is recipient of the Queen Diamond Jubilee Medal for his services in Canada. He is the founder of Canadian Thinkers Forum, the Progressive Muslims Institute Canada and Muslim Committee Against Antisemitism.

Books
Two novels, three collections of short stories and two collections of poems in Urdu have been published, and translated into Hindi, Russian and Uzbek languages.

Translations 
Gora is responsible for the Urdu translation of Irshad Manji’s book “The Trouble with Islam Today”. He is also involved in the translation of the writings of Daniel Pipes and Samia Labidi into the Urdu language.

Selected bibliography 
Submission: The Danger of Political Islam to Canada, with a Warning to America (Co-author).
Safar Akher Safar Hey (short stories in Urdu), Pakistan, Maktaba Tamseel, 1985.
Mohlat (novel in Urdu). Pakistan, Tarteeb Publishers, 1993
Yeh Udassi Ki Baat Nahein (poems in Urdu). Pakistan, Tarteeb Publishers, 1993.
Trevogi Nadegi (novel as a Russian translation). Uzbekistan, Asian Publishers, 1997.
This is not a Matter of Sorrow (English translation of poetry). Pakistan, Tarteeb Publishers, 1997.

See also
 Tarek Fatah

References

External links
 
 Tahir Gora YouTube Channel 
 TAG TV YouTube Channel

Pakistani emigrants to Canada
Naturalized citizens of Canada
Pakistani writers
Pakistani book publishers (people)
Urdu-language poets from Pakistan
Pakistani exiles
Pakistani translators
English–Urdu translators
Translators to Urdu
People from Kasur District
1963 births
Living people
Canadian activists
Political activists
People from Lahore
Pakistani activists
Pakistani political commentators
Pakistani political writers
Canadian Muslims
Canadian Muslim activists
Pakistani Muslims
Canadian people of Punjabi descent